Rita kuturnee is a species of bagrid catfish endemic to India where it occurs in the rivers of the Deccan Plateau up to the Krishna River system. It is an inhabitant of large rivers. It grows to a total length of 30 cm and is commercially fished for human consumption.

References 

Bagridae
Catfish of Asia
Freshwater fish of India
Endemic fauna of India
Taxa named by William Henry Sykes
Fish described in 1839